Glorious is American singer Gloria Gaynor's fourth studio album. It was released in 1977 on Polydor Records.

The album was remastered and reissued with bonus tracks in 2016 by Big Break Records.

Track listing

Personnel
Gloria Gaynor – lead vocals
Kim Carlson, Jocelyne Shaw, Angela Howell – backing vocals
Steve Love – rhythm guitar (guitar solo on "Why I Should Pay")
Jim Gregory – bass guitar
Allan Schwartzberg – drums
Don Grolnick – piano, keyboards, Fender Rhodes, clavinet 
Jack Waldman – piano, keyboards, orchestration
Jimmy Maelen, Godfrey Diamond – percussion
Joe Beck – guitar solo, orchestration
Gregg Diamond – percussion, piano, orchestration
Joe Ferguson – alto saxophone solo on "This Side of the Pain"
George Young, Eddie Daniels, George Marge – saxophone
Marvin Stamm, Alan Rubin, John Frosk, Peter Ecklund – trumpet
Wayne Andre, Alan Raph, Barry Rogers – trombone
Gene Orloff – concertmaster, strings
Brad Baker – orchestration

Production
Gregg Diamond, Joe Beck – producers, arrangers
Godfrey Diamond – engineer, mixing
Woszczyk Wieslaw, Trudy Cali, Lucy Lauri, Tom Duffy, Michael Barbiero, Jonathan Kats – assistant engineers
Dominick Romeo, Roy Jones – mastering
David Croland – cover
Beverly Parker – art direction

Charts

References

External links
 

1977 albums
Gloria Gaynor albums
Polydor Records albums